Troja is a surname. Notable people with the surname include:

 Eleonora Troja, Italian astrophysicist 
 Gaetano Troja (born 1944), Italian footballer
 Michele Troja (1747–1827), Italian physician

See also
 Troja (disambiguation)
 Troia (surname)